Seminole High School, originally established as Sanford High School, is a public high school located in Sanford, Florida, operated by Seminole County Public Schools. From 2006 to 2011, Seminole High School was one of the schools in Seminole County on Newsweek's list of the top 1,200 schools in the United States. The school  offers the International Baccalaureate Diploma Programme. The Academy for Health Careers provides a curriculum based on a future career in health care. Students take a health class and health material is integrated into the curriculum of all other subjects. Seminole High also offers Advanced Placement courses in a range of subjects.

School rankings
In the 2007–08,  2008–09, 2009–10, 2010–11, and 2012–13 school year, the Florida Department of Education gave Seminole an "A" ranking. This was an improvement from 2006–07's "C."

Newsweek rated Seminole #303 in their list of the top 1,200 schools in the country in 2006.
Newsweek rated Seminole #150 in their list of the top 1,200 high schools in the country in 2007, making it the highest ranked high school in Seminole County.

History
Sanford High School was built in 1902.  In 1911 the student population necessitated the building of a new Sanford High School on Sanford Avenue.  In 1927 a much larger building opened on French Avenue, and the school was renamed Seminole High School.  By 1961 a new sprawling campus was opened at the present location on Ridgewood Avenue, and the old building on French Avenue became Sanford Junior High School (later renamed Sanford Middle School).  Seminole High School has grown not only in the size of the campus, but also in student population – in 1907, only four students attended and graduated Seminole High School. Today, the graduation rate in Seminole High School is 86%. The original building on 7th Street was for a time used as the Student Museum, open to elementary field trips to represent the rich history of education in Seminole County. In 2012 that building was reopened, in a partnership between Seminole County and the University of Central Florida as the Public History Museum; this made it open to the general public, as well as laboratory for university students to gain hands-on experience displaying history to the public.

Renovation
In 2004, the school began renovations costing over $10 million, including the construction of new classroom halls; a new media center was opened  in 2006, a new gym was opened at  the beginning of the 2007-2008 school year, and a new auditorium.  The renovation was completed in 2010. Tomahawk Hall opened at the beginning of the second quarter of the 2006-07 school year. A performing arts center, later to be named in honor of former principal Karen W. Coleman, opened in March 2008. Seminole High's Thespians were the first to use the center, producing The Pink Panther Strikes Again that month. Construction on a new building, now called Renegade, was completed in Spring 2009.

Renovations on the cafeteria began in early 2009 and were finished at the beginning of the 2009–10 school year. and the construction on a new building, now called Warrior Hall in the east side of the campus. The current amount of renovations completed, and to be built, total about $55 million.

International Baccalaureate
Seminole High offers both the International Baccalaureate Diploma Programme and the last two years of the IB Middle Years Programme. Many Seminole High IB students begin the Middle Years Programme at one of four Seminole County middle schools which offer the program. IB students spend the first two years of high school in Pre-IB before being officially inducted into IB their junior year at what is known as the "IB Pinning Ceremony".

The IB program has been offered since 1998.

Additional extra curricular activities

Seminole High School hosts Troupe 3266 of the International Thespian Society. Students may take part in the theatre department through classes or audition for the fall play and spring musical.

On April 21–23, 2017 the Seminole High School Theatre Company produced The Wedding Singer.

The school newspaper, The Seminole, is an elective course in which students may involve themselves in journalism, publishing, layout/design, photography, and advertising.

Students may also be a part of the school’s yearbook, the Salmagundi Yearbook. Students must fill out an application and go through an interview process before being selected.

Athletics
Sports practiced at the school include baseball, basketball, cheerleading, dance, track and cross country running, football, golf, lacrosse, soccer, softball, swimming and diving, tennis, volleyball, water polo, weightlifting, wrestling, and bowling.

The Seminole High School Varsity football played in the 6A Florida State Finals on December 20, 2008 winning against Miami Northwestern High School. Video of Hail to the Champs Parade sponsored by the City of Sanford. 

As of the 2017–18 school year, the Varsity football team plays in the 8A division.

In the 2020 school year, the school became the state champions for the 8A division. The Varsity football team won the 8A Florida State Finals against the Osceola Kowboys on December 19, 2020. The score was with a score of 38-10. This made them the third high school in history (behind Apopka and Bishop Moore) to win more than one football state championship. Prior to the finals, the team was undefeated 11-0 (12-0 with the final).

Seminole High School hosts the Dazzler Dance Team. The Dazzlers have earned over 16 National Titles in high kick since 1997, and have numerous other awards in field marching/performing, jazz, contemporary, pom, hip hop, lyrical, and military.

Notable alumni
 David Nelson (Alaska politician) – Former Alaska politician
 Matt Allan - professional baseball pitcher in the New York Mets organization
 Ray-Ray Armstrong – Linebacker for San Francisco 49ers
 Red Barber – noted Ford C. Frick Award recipient and sportscaster for the Cincinnati Reds, Brooklyn Dodgers, and New York Yankees.
 Jeff Blake – NFL quarterback for the Chicago Bears
 John F. Bolt – recipient of the Navy Cross and only Marine to achieve the title of ace in both World War II and the Korean War.
 Reggie Branch – Former running back for the Washington Redskins
 Mack Cleveland (Class of 1942) – attorney and state legislator from Seminole County
 Gabe Davis – NFL player for the Buffalo Bills. Holds NFL record for most receiving touchdowns in a single playoff game  
 David Eckstein – MLB shortstop who was the 2006 World Series MVP with St. Louis Cardinals
 Kadeem Edwards – former NFL player
 Jeff Faine – NFL for the Tampa Bay Buccaneers
 Vienna Girardi – winner of season 14 of The Bachelor
 Ben Kozlowski – former professional baseball player (Texas Rangers)
 Matt Kuchar – professional golfer on the PGA Tour
 Doug Marlette – Pulitzer Prize winning cartoonist and author
 Ron Moore – NFL defensive tackle
 Tim Raines – retired MLB player and current coach. MLB Hall of Fame.
 Tim Raines Jr. – Former professional baseball player (Baltimore Orioles)
 Hardy Rawls – actor on TV sitcom The Adventures of Pete & Pete
 Charles Riggins – former NFL player
 Jeff Roth – AFL player

References

External links
Seminole High School
Seminole High School Band
Dazzler Dance Team
The International Baccalaureate Program at Seminole High
School Newspaper
Thespian Troupe 3266
Seminole High School Choirs
Seminole High School Yearbook, Salmagundi
Video of the Alma Mater 

Seminole County Public Schools
Educational institutions established in 1902
High schools in Seminole County, Florida
Public high schools in Florida
1902 establishments in Florida
International Baccalaureate schools
International Baccalaureate schools in the United States
International Baccalaureate schools in Florida